Kincardine is a small hamlet in Sutherland, situated on the west end of the south shore of the Dornoch Firth. The village of Ardgay is less than 1 mile north west of Kincardine along the A836 coast road.

Etymology 
The name Kincardine, as with other locations so-named, may be a Gaelic adaptation of a Pictish name. The second element is the Pictish *carden, perhaps meaning "encampment" or "brake". The first element represent Gaelic ceann substituting an original Pictish *pen, both meaning "end, head, top", giving an aboriginal form of *Pencarden.

See also
Kincardine (disambiguation)

References

Populated places in Sutherland